The 1976 Milwaukee Brewers season involved the Brewers' finishing sixth in the American League East with 66 wins and 95 losses.. It was the seventh consecutive losing season in Milwaukee and the eighth overall for the franchise since its inception.

Offseason 
 November 14, 1975: Ed Romero was signed as an amateur free agent by the Brewers.

Regular season

Hank Aaron's 755th 
 July 20, 1976: Hank Aaron hit the 755th and final home run of his career off California Angels pitcher Dick Drago.

Line score 
July 20, County Stadium, Milwaukee, Wisconsin

Hank Aaron's final home runs

Season standings

Record vs. opponents

Opening day starters 
 Hank Aaron
 Pedro García
 Sixto Lezcano
 Don Money
 Charlie Moore
 Darrell Porter
 George Scott
 Bill Sharp
 Jim Slaton
 Robin Yount

Notable transactions 
 June 2, 1976: Von Joshua was purchased by the Brewers from the San Francisco Giants.
 June 3, 1976: Bobby Darwin and Tom Murphy were traded by the Brewers to the Boston Red Sox for Bernie Carbo.
 June 8, 1976: Bill Bordley was drafted by the Brewers in the 1st round (4th pick) of the 1976 Major League Baseball draft, but did not sign.

Roster

Player stats

Batting

Starters by position 
Note: Pos = Position; G = Games played; AB = At bats; H = Hits; Avg. = Batting average; HR = Home runs; RBI = Runs batted in

Other batters 
Note: G = Games played; AB = At bats; H = Hits; Avg. = Batting average; HR = Home runs; RBI = Runs batted in

Pitching

Starting pitchers 
Note: G = Games pitched; IP = Innings pitched; W = Wins; L = Losses; ERA = Earned run average; SO = Strikeouts

Other pitchers 
Note: G = Games pitched; IP = Innings pitched; W = Wins; L = Losses; ERA = Earned run average; SO = Strikeouts

Relief pitchers 
Note: G = Games pitched; W = Wins; L = Losses; SV = Saves; ERA = Earned run average; SO = Strikeouts

Farm system

The Brewers' farm system consisted of four minor league affiliates in 1976.

References

External links
1976 Milwaukee Brewers at Baseball Reference
1976 Milwaukee Brewers at Baseball Almanac

Milwaukee Brewers seasons
Milwaukee Brewers season
Mil